"Lights Down Low" is the first single by rapper 2 Pistols for his second album Arrogant. It features singer Young Joe. 2 Pistols' part was recorded over an original instrumental, and the track was re-produced by Cool & Dre, who added their artist and rapper C-Ride (Epidemic/Polo Grounds). This is the first single from 2 Pistols' deal with Blood Money Union/Young Money Entertainment/Cash Money Records/Universal Motown. It reached number 63 on Hot R&B/Hip-Hop Songs, and number 13 on the Hot Rap Tracks chart. It was also released on MTV, Music Choice and various other major broadcasting networks.

Charts

References

2008 songs
2009 singles
Cash Money Records singles
Universal Motown Records singles
Song recordings produced by Cool & Dre